Cyrtlatherium is a dubious genus of extinct docodontan mammaliaform from the Middle Jurassic rocks of Oxfordshire, England. As it is only known from a few isolated molar teeth, there is disagreement about whether Cyrtlatherium is a separate genus, or whether it is a synonym and the molar teeth are the milk teeth of another genus of docodont.

Cyrtlatherium was named from a few single molar teeth found in the Kirtlington mammal beds in England, which were originally thought to belong to a kuehneotheriid, but were later reclassified as belonging to a docodont. When reclassifying it, Sigogneau-Russell argued that it was the milk tooth of a previously named docodont called Simpsonodon. This is now generally accepted to be the case by most mammal palaeontologists.

References

Docodonts
Jurassic synapsids of Europe
Fossil taxa described in 1979
Taxa named by Eric F. Freeman
Prehistoric cynodont genera